Michael O'Halloran is a 1923 American silent drama film directed by James Leo Meehan and starring Virginia True Boardman, Ethel Irving and Irene Rich. It is an adaptation of the novel of the same name by Gene Stratton-Porter.

Cast
 Virginia True Boardman as Michael O'Halloran 
 Ethel Irving as Peaches 
 Irene Rich as Nellie Minturn 
 Charles Clary as James Minturn 
 Claire McDowell as Nancy Harding 
 Charles Hill Mailes as Peter Harding 
 Josie Sedgwick as Leslie Winton 
 William Boyd as Douglas Bruce

References

Bibliography
 Taves, Brian. Thomas Ince: Hollywood's Independent Pioneer. University Press of Kentucky, 2012.

External links
 

1923 films
1923 drama films
1920s English-language films
American silent feature films
Silent American drama films
Films based on American novels
American black-and-white films
Films based on works by Gene Stratton-Porter
Films distributed by W. W. Hodkinson Corporation
Films directed by James Leo Meehan
1920s American films